Van Dam ("of the dam") is a Dutch toponymic surname. People with this name include:

Andries van Dam (b. 1930), Dutch-born American computer scientist
Carlo van Dam (b. 1986), Dutch racing driver
Cornelis Van Dam (b. 1946), Canadian Old Testament scholar
Cornelis P. G. van Dam (b. 1954), Professor of Mechanical & Aerospace Engr., University of California, Davis
Danielle van Dam (1994-2002), American murder victim
Dave Van Dam, American voice impressionist
 (1827–1898), Dutch naturalist, explorer and museum curator
 (1670-1746), Dutch mathematician and astronomer
Johannes van Dam (1946–2013), Dutch journalist and food writer
José van Dam (b. 1940), Belgian bass-baritone
Joseph Van Dam (1901-1986), Belgian road cyclist
Lex van Dam (b. 1968), Dutch hedge fund manager 
Lloyd van Dams (b. 1972), Dutch–Surinamese kickboxer
 (1920-1976), Dutch boxer
Marcel van Dam (b. 1938), Dutch sociologist, politician and television presenter
Marinus van Dam (1929-1997), Dutch-born American candy maker
Martijn van Dam (b. 1978), Dutch engineer and politician
Max van Dam (1910–1943), Dutch painter
Nicolette van Dam (b. 1984), Dutch actress
Nikolaos van Dam (b. 1945), Dutch diplomat and Middle East expert
Paul Van Dam (born 1937), Utah politician
 (born 1952), Dutch politician
Rip Van Dam (c.1660-1749), New York Province politician
Rob Van Dam (b. 1970), American professional wrestler
Stephan Van Dam (b. 1959), American cartographer and graphic designer
Thijs van Dam (b, 1997), Dutch field hockey player

The forms VanDam, Vandam or Vandamm  are often indicative of a family of Dutch or Flemish origin which had lived for generations in a non-Dutch speaking environment, for example:

Albert Dresden Vandam (1843–1903), English journalist and writer
Jerry Vandam (b. 1988), Ghanaian-French footballer 
Kevin VanDam (b. 1967), American fisherman
 Major William Vandam, fictional British officer in Ken Follett's The Key to Rebecca
 Phillip Vandamm, fictional spy in Hitchcock's North by Northwest

See also
 Dam, Danish surname
van Damm
van Damme
Vandamme
Vandam, a village in Azerbaijan
 Vandam Street in Greenwich Village, New York City
Van Dam's vanga, a bird named after Douwe Casparus van Dam

Dutch-language surnames
Surnames of Dutch origin